Manfred Lindner (born 22 February 1957)  is a German physicist and director at the Max Planck Institute for Nuclear Physics in Heidelberg, Germany. He conducts basic research in particle and astro-particle physics.

Life and Scientific Work

Manfred Lindner studied physics from 1978 bis 1984 at the Ludwig-Maximilians-Universität in Munich, Germany, where he received his PhD in 1987. 
Subsequently, he was from 1987 to 1989 postdoc at the Fermi National Accelerator Laboratory (Fermilab) in Chicago and from 1989 to 1991 Fellow at CERN in Geneva, Switzerland.
After that, Manfred Lindner spent 1991–1993 with a Heisenberg-Fellowship at Heidelberg University in Heidelberg, Germany.

Manfred Lindner got his Habilitation in 1992. In 1993 he became a professor for theoretical physics at the Technische Universität München where he was teaching and conducting research from 1993 until 2006. Starting 2006 he became director at the Max Planck Institute for Nuclear Physics in Heidelberg, Germany. Since 2007 he is also a professor at the faculty for physics and astronomy of Heidelberg University, where he continues to teach. From 2009 until 2011 he was managing director of the Max Planck Institute for Nuclear Physics. He is spokesperson of the International Max Planck Research School for Precision Tests of Fundamental Symmetries (IMPRS-PTFS) 
and he is furthermore in various international research networks. Manfred Lindner works as referee for various national and international agencies and he is referee or member of the editorial board for various scientific journals. He is furthermore a member of numerous advisory boards of international conferences, and he was Chair of the most important international conference on neutrino physics in 2018 in Heidelberg (NEUTRINO 2018).

Main research areas

The research of Manfred Lindner is in the field of particle and astro-particle physics. The research spectrum ranges from formal theoretical questions to experimental projects. The theoretical studies concern the standard model of particle physics and its extensions. On the experimental side Manfred Lindner and his division make leading contributions to international research projects in the field of neutrino physics and dark matter search. 
The main experimental projects is currently XENON aiming at the direct detection of Dark Matter. Lindner is co-spokesperson of the international XENON Collaboration which achieved with its XENON1T detector world-leading results for the direct detection of Dark Matter. The next detector generation, XENONnT, became operational in 2021 and it will push the sensitivity further. 
The CONUS-Experiment 

aims in the area of neutrino physics at detecting coherent neutrino scattering at low energies. 
Another project is the STEREO experiment

which aims at detecting or refuting sterile neutrinos at the research reactor at  ILL in Grenoble.
The GERDA

experiment and its upgrade to 
LEGEND200 

aim at detecting neutrino-less double beta decay.
Various R&D activities aim at future experiments like DARWIN

and future neutrino experiments.

Distinctions and awards

In 1990 he was awarded a Heisenberg Stipendium of the Deutschen Forschungsgemeinschaft (DFG) which he used from 1991 to teach and conduct research at the Universität Heidelberg. 
In 2016 Manfred Lindner was awarded an honorary doctorate of the KTH Royal Institute of Technology (Kungliga Tekniska Högsksolan, KTH) in Stockholm for important contributions to neutrino physics. The conferment was on November 18, 2016, at an academic ceremony in the Stockholm Concert Hall, followed by a banquet and ball room dancing in the City hall of Stockholm. KTH was founded in 1827 and is Sweden's largest institution of higher education in technology and it awards honorary doctorates to individuals who have done outstanding work while at the same time providing KTH with positive attention.
The American Association for the Advancement of Science (AAAS) selected Lindner in 2020 as AAAS Fellow in recognition for distinguished contributions to both theoretical and experimental particle physics.

Publications (selection)

 
 
  
 
 
 

A complete listing of scientific publications by Manfred Lindner can be found on INSPIRE-HEP at this link.

References

External links
 Manfred Lindner at the MPI for Nuclear Physics
 Division for Particle and Astroparticle Physics at the MPI for Nuclear Physics
 Web pages of the MPI for Nuclear Physics
 Publications of Manfred Lindner in the INSPIRE-HEP data base
 The Academic Family Tree of Manfred Lindner

                   

1957 births
Living people
21st-century German physicists
Academic staff of the Technical University of Munich
Academic staff of Heidelberg University
Theoretical physicists
People associated with CERN
20th-century German physicists
Ludwig Maximilian University of Munich alumni
Max Planck Institute directors